Cryptolestes turcicus, the flour mill beetle, is a species of lined flat bark beetle in the family Laemophloeidae. It is found in North America and Europe.

References

Further reading

External links

 

Laemophloeidae
Articles created by Qbugbot
Beetles described in 1876